Ismaël Mickael Bouzid (born 21 July 1983) is a former professional footballer who played mainly as a centre-back but had also been used as a right-back. Born in France, he represented Algeria at international level.

Club career
Born in Nancy, France, Bouzid started his career with FC Metz. In July 2001, he had a trial with English Premier League side Sunderland and played in a pre-season match between Sunderland and Calais. Bouzid then played in Germany, Algeria, Turkey and France, including spells at football clubs like 1. FC Kaiserslautern and Troyes. Bouzid joined Galatasaray at the start of the 2007–08 season. He made ten league appearances for the side, helping them to win the Süper Lig title in May 2008. In doing so, Bouzid became the first Algerian player to win a Süper Lig medal.

Heart of Midlothian
On 9 July 2009, Bouzid joined Hearts from Ankaragücü. Bouzid scored his first goal for Hearts at Tynecastle against Celtic on 20 December 2009, which also proved to be the winning goal. In June 2011, after two years playing for the Edinburgh club, he was released alongside Rubén Palazuelos, Dawid Kucharski, Paul Mulrooney and Jamie Mole.

After his release
In July 2011, Crawley Town gave Bouzid a trial. However, manager Steve Evans decided against signing him after Bouzid played in a friendly match against Peterborough United.

PAS Giannina
Bouzid signed a two-year deal with newly promoted Greek Superleague team, PAS Giannina in August 2011. Although several clubs around Europe were linked with Bouzid he chose the Greek side because of the 'team spirit'.

USM Alger
On 3 October 2012, Bouzid signed a two-year deal with Algerian Ligue Professionnelle 1 team USM Alger. He made just three league appearances for reaching a mutual agreement with the club to terminate his contract at the end of the 2012–13 season.

Kilmarnock
In the summer of 2013, Bouzid went on trial with Scottish Second Division side East Fife and on 20 September 2013, signed with Scottish Premiership side Kilmarnock after impressing on trial.

On 25 June Bouzid began a short-term trial at Rangers.

Personal life 
Bouzid's younger brother, Adam Bouzid, is also a professional footballer and currently plays for the German side SVN Zweibrücken.

Honours
MC Alger
 Algerian Cup: 2005–06

Galatasaray
 Süper Lig: 2007–08

References

External links 
 
 
 Ismaël Bouzid at TFF.org

1983 births
Living people
French sportspeople of Algerian descent
Sportspeople from Nancy, France
French footballers
Algerian footballers
Footballers from Grand Est
Algeria under-23 international footballers
Algeria international footballers
Association football central defenders

FC Metz players
1. FC Union Berlin players
MC Alger players
1. FC Kaiserslautern players
Galatasaray S.K. footballers
ES Troyes AC players
MKE Ankaragücü footballers
Heart of Midlothian F.C. players
PAS Giannina F.C. players
Baniyas Club players
USM Alger players
Kilmarnock F.C. players
FC Progrès Niederkorn players
FC Swift Hesperange players

Scottish Premier League players
UAE Pro League players
Scottish Professional Football League players
Süper Lig players
Ligue 2 players
2. Bundesliga players
Super League Greece players
Algerian Ligue Professionnelle 1 players

French expatriate footballers
Algerian expatriate footballers
Algerian expatriate sportspeople in Germany
French expatriate sportspeople in Germany
Expatriate footballers in Germany
Algerian expatriate sportspeople in Turkey
French expatriate sportspeople in Turkey
Expatriate footballers in Turkey
Algerian expatriate sportspeople in Scotland
French expatriate sportspeople in Scotland
Expatriate footballers in Scotland
Algerian expatriate sportspeople in Greece
French expatriate sportspeople in Greece
Expatriate footballers in Greece
Algerian expatriate sportspeople in the United Arab Emirates
French expatriate sportspeople in the United Arab Emirates
Expatriate footballers in the United Arab Emirates
Algerian expatriate sportspeople in Luxembourg
French expatriate sportspeople in Luxembourg
Expatriate footballers in Luxembourg